Moshkabad or Mashkabad, also rendered as Mushkabad or Mashgabad, may refer to:
Moshkabad, Markazi
Moshkabad, Qom
Moshkabad, Razavi Khorasan
Mashkabad-e Olya, West Azerbaijan Province
Mashkabad-e Sofla, West Azerbaijan Province
Moshkabad, Zanjan
Moshkabad Rural District, in Markazi Province